The 2012 Women's U23 Pan-American Volleyball Cup was the first edition of the bi-annual women's volleyball tournament, played by eight countries from September 3–8, 2012 in Callao, Peru.

Competing Nations

Pool standing procedure
Match won 3–0: 5 points for the winner, 0 point for the loser
Match won 3–1: 4 points for the winner, 1 points for the loser
Match won 3–2: 3 points for the winner, 2 points for the loser
The first criterion is the number of matches won, second criterion is points gained by the team
In case of tie, the teams were classified according to the criteria points ratio and sets ratio

Preliminary round
 Venue:  Miguel Grau Colisseum, Callao, Peru
 All times are Peruvian Standard Time (UTC−05:00)

Group A

Group B

Final round

Championship bracket

5th to 8th places bracket

Quarterfinals

Classification 5th to 8th

Semifinals

7th place match

5th place match

3rd place match

Final

Final standing

Winifer Fernández,
Lisvel Eve,
Marianne Fersola,
Brenda Castillo (L),
Pamela Soriano,
Niverka Marte,
Cándida Arias,
Jeoselyna Rodríguez,
Celenia Toribio,
Yonkaira Peña,
Galia González,
Brayelin Martínez,

Individual awards

Most Valuable Player

Best Scorer

Best Spiker

Best Blocker

Best Server

Best Digger

Best Setter

Best Receiver

Best Libero

References

Women's Pan-American Volleyball Cup
Women's U23 Pan-American Volleyball Cup
Women's U23 Pan-American Volleyball Cup
2012 Women's U23 Pan-American Volleyball Cup